Oran Hurling (Uarain) is a Gaelic Athletic Association club located in the parishes of Oran in mid County Roscommon, Ireland. They play in Green and Yellow colours and their home pitch is Rockfield.
The club fields underage teams from U-12 to U-21 as well as Senior and Junior teams. In 2016 they won the county final when poc fada star Jerry Fallon put over a free from his own 45m line against a gale-force wind.

Brief history
The club was founded by Micheal Kelly N.T. and Gerry Mahon N.T. The Junior and Underage section was founded in 1965 and a Senior team in 1983.

1987-1992

5 Roscommon Senior Hurling Championship finals and 3 victories

1998-2003

3 finals and 1 victory

2004

Won the county final for the 5th time

2016

Won the county final for the 6th time

On 29 October 2016, Oran won the senior hurling final in a sequel to the first of the two clashes between the two hurling giants of Roscommon. Oran who trailed for most of the game kept ticking the scoreboard ticking with King Jerry Fallon on the frees. In the last minute of stoppage time Oran trailed by a point. Oran had just earned a free on their own 21 yard line. Against a 50 km wind, King Gerry struck a waterlogged sliotar over the bar against all odds. The game was drawn and extra time ensued. Right from the off, Oran took the game by the scruff of the neck and scored 2 goals and 3 points against Four Roads. Oran led by 9 points and had made a 10-point turn around since Four Roads last score. The 8 in a row champions were denied their ninth trophy by the Oran side.

Honours

Senior Hurling Championships: 6
1989, 1990, 1992, 1998, 2004, 2016
 Runners-up 1987, 1991, 1999, 2003, 2009, 2013
Roscommon Senior Hurling League:

Connacht Hurling League

Connacht Junior Club Hurling Championship
2004
All-Ireland Junior Club Hurling Championship
Runners-up 2005
Roscommon Junior Hurling Championships:

Roscommon Minor Hurling Championship:
 2004

References

External links

Gaelic games clubs in County Roscommon
Hurling clubs in County Roscommon